Fidelis Oditah KC, SAN (born 1964) is a Nigerian barrister, an authority on insolvency law. He is President of the Nigerian Branch of the International Law Association. Oditah was born in Nigeria.

At the age of twenty he graduated from the University of Lagos with a first-class degree in law and twelve of the thirteen available prizes (1984). The following year, he graduated with the highest first-class honours awarded that year by the Nigerian Law School (1985). In the next year he was awarded a Commonwealth Scholarship enabling him to study at the University of Oxford (Magdalen College, 1986–1989), where he obtained the degree of Bachelor of Civil Law (1987) and of Doctor of Philosophy (1989), completing his DPhil thesis in only two years.

Oditah was called to the bar (Lincoln's Inn) in 1992 and became a Queen's Counsel in 2003, aged thirty-nine, after eleven years at the bar.

Oditah published Legal Aspects of Receivables Financing in 1990. The book is an expanded version of his doctoral thesis.

Oditah was a Fellow and Tutor in Law at Merton College, Oxford and Travers Smith Braithwaite Lecturer in Corporate Finance Law in the University of Oxford from 1989 to 1997. He resigned in order to practice full-time at the English bar.  He has been a visiting professor at the Oxford University Faculty of Law since 2000.  He also served as a consultant to the United Nations Commission on International Trade Law (UNCITRAL) from 1995 to 1999.

Cases in which Oditah has appeared in include On Demand Information Plc & ors v Michael Gerson [2002] 2 WLR 919 (HL), Cadbury Schweppes plc v Somji [2001] 1 WLR 615 (CA), Re ASRS Establishment Ltd [2000] 2 BCLC 631 (CA) and BCCI v Akindele [2001] Ch 437 (CA).

Oditah was a candidate for the office of Governor of Delta State in Nigeria'in 2007.

References

External links
Professional website
Imene Johnson, Communal interest and the Oditah challenge in Delta politics, Vanguard (27 November 2006)

English barristers
Members of Lincoln's Inn
1964 births
English legal scholars
University of Lagos alumni
Alumni of Magdalen College, Oxford
Fellows of Merton College, Oxford
Living people
English people of Nigerian descent
Legal scholars of the University of Oxford